Find Me My Man is a television series airing on the Oxygen Network. The show follows match-maker Natalie Clarice as she attempts to pair up new couples and instruct them on how to develop long-term relationships.

References

2010s American reality television series
Oxygen (TV channel) original programming
2013 American television series debuts
2013 American television series endings
Television series by Endemol